Thierry Albert De Neef (born 27 October 1966) is a former French footballer. He is currently manager of French Guiana.

Club career
In 1986, De Neef began his career in France with US Créteil. De Neef spent four seasons at the club, before moving to CS Fontainebleau in 1990. In 1992, De Neef signed for Ligue 2 club Sedan. At Sedan, De Neef made over 75 appearances in all competitions. In 1992, De Neef joined Ligue 1 club Nice. In his final season at the club, De Neef won the 1996–97 Coupe de France, scoring a penalty in the penalty shout-out in the final against EA Guingamp. In 1997, De Neef signed for Le Havre, making 154 league appearances, scoring four times, in five seasons at the club. After leaving Le Havre, De Neef played for Olympique Alès, Tours and Rapid Menton in successive seasons.

In November 2004, De Neef played three times for French Guiana in qualification matches for the 2005 CONCACAF Gold Cup.

Managerial career
In 2007, De Neef was appointed manager of French Guiana Honor Division club CSC Cayenne. CSC Cayenne finished second in the league twice under De Neef's reign at the club, before leaving in 2013.

In April 2018, De Neef was appointed manager of French Guiana.

Honours

Club
OGC Nice
 Coupe de France: 1997

References

1966 births
Living people
Footballers from Paris
French footballers
Association football midfielders
French people of French Guianan descent
French Guiana international footballers
US Créteil-Lusitanos players
CS Sedan Ardennes players
OGC Nice players
Le Havre AC players
Olympique Alès players
Tours FC players
Rapid de Menton players
French Guiana national football team managers
French football managers
French expatriate football managers
Ligue 2 players
Ligue 1 players
Championnat National players
French Guianan footballers